The Antarctic lanternfish or Electrona antarctica mainly inhabits the Antarctic deep, warm waters. It is the dominant species in the Southern Ocean. Their life span is about 4–5 years and they mature after 2–3 years. Their maximum length is 12.5 cm. Their feeding depends upon area to area. Small fish primarily feed on copepods, euphausiid larvae, and hyperiids. This species is mainly the nektonic prey species of seabirds in open water. It is an important krill predator and serves as prey for a majority of seabirds. It is one of the southernmost fish species, being recorded as far south as 74°40′S in the Ross Sea.

References

Myctophidae
Fish of the Southern Ocean
Taxa named by Albert Günther
Fish described in 1878